Karlshorst (literally meaning Karl's nest) is a locality in the borough of Lichtenberg in Berlin. Located there are a harness racing track and the Hochschule für Technik und Wirtschaft Berlin (HTW), the largest University of Applied Sciences in Berlin, and the German-Russian Museum Berlin-Karlshorst.

History

Established in 1895 as the Carlshorst mansion's colony, Karlshorst from 1901 had access to the railway line from Berlin to Breslau (today Wrocław, Poland) and developed to a quite affluent residential area, sometimes referred to as "Dahlem of the East". The locality encompasses the Waldsiedlung, a garden city laid out between 1919 and 1921 according to plans by Peter Behrens.

In April 1945, as the Red Army approached the Reich's capital, Marshal Georgy Zhukov, commander of the 1st Belorussian Front, established his headquarters at a former Heer officer's mess hall in Karlshorst, where on May 8, the unconditional surrender of the German forces was presented to Zhukov by Colonel-General Hans-Jürgen Stumpff as the representative of the Luftwaffe, Field Marshal Wilhelm Keitel as Chief of Staff of OKW, and Admiral Hans-Georg von Friedeburg as Commander-in-Chief of the Kriegsmarine.

From 1945 to 1949 the building complex served as the headquarters of the Soviet Military Administration in Germany. After the establishment of the German Democratic Republic, it hosted the 6th Independent Motorized Rifle Brigade, the Soviets' "Berlin Brigade." The leadership of the Politburo of the Socialist Unity Party of Germany hid at the complex during the East German uprising of 1953, where Lavrentiy Beria also traveled to from Moscow to personally coordinate the Soviet Army's repression of the rebellion. The last Russian soldiers left Karlshorst in 1994. The former headquarters has been made the home of the German-Russian Museum Berlin-Karlshorst (Deutsch-Russisches Museum Berlin-Karlshorst), formerly called the Capitulation Museum.

Transportation
Karlshorst has access to the Berlin S-Bahn network at Berlin-Karlshorst railway station.

Notable people

Born in Karlshorst
 Joachim Fest, historian, editor, (1926-2006)
 Ilja Richter (born 1952), actor, voice actor and television presenter

Dwelt in Karlshorst

 Max Beer, (1864-1943), historian, Gundelfinger Straße 47
 Hans Bellmer, (1902-1975), photographer, Ehrenfelsstraße 8
 Hans (1916-1942) and Hilde Coppi, (1909-1943), resistance fighters, Römerweg
 Hedwig Courths-Mahler, (1867-1950), writer, Dönhoffstraße 11 from 1905 to 1914
 Erich Ollenhauer, (1901-1963), politician, dwelt in Karlshorst, Trautenauer Straße 6
 August Stramm, (1874-1915), poet, Lehndorffstraße 16
 Ernst Torgler, (1903-1963), politician (Communist Party of Germany), Liepnitzstraße 46
 Max Wertheimer, (1880-1943), psychologist, Ehrlichstraße 31
The engineer Georg Knorr (1859-1911), is buried at the Karlshorst cemetery.

See also
 Victory in Europe Day

References

External links

 https://web.archive.org/web/20050408044705/http://www.karlshorst.de/ – official site
 http://www.karlshorst-info.de/ – information about Karlshorst
 https://web.archive.org/web/20060822091136/http://www.treskowallee.de/ – information about Karlshorst
 http://www.museum-karlshorst.de/ – German-Russian Museum Berlin-Karlshorst
 http://www.fckarlshorst.de/ – official site of FC Karlshorst 1995

Localities of Berlin
Karlshorst
Treskow family